The 1920 Maryland Aggies football team was an American football team that represented the University of Maryland in the South Atlantic Intercollegiate Athletic Association (SAIAA) during the 1920 college football season. In their 10th season under head coach Curley Byrd, the Aggies compiled a 7–2 record (4–0 against  SAIAA opponents), shut out five of nine opponents, and outscored all opponents by a total of 149 to 55. The losses were sustained against Rutgers (6–0) and Princeton (35–0).

Schedule

References

Maryland
Maryland Terrapins football seasons
Maryland Aggies football